This is a list of public holidays in Christmas Island.

Public holidays

See also
Public holidays in Australia

References

Christmas Island culture
Christmas Island
Public holidays in Australia